Hender is both a masculine given name and a surname. Notable people with the name include:

Taylar Hender (born 1998), American actress
Hender Molesworth (died 1689), British diplomat and Governor of Jamaica
Hender Robartes (1635–1688), English politician

See also
Henders

Masculine given names